is a Japanese animation studio founded on November 10, 2000 in Nanto, Toyama. The company's president and founder Kenji Horikawa once worked for Tatsunoko Production, Production I.G and Bee Train Production, before forming P.A. Works Corporation. The studio changed its name to P.A. Works in 2002. The main office is located in Toyama Prefecture, where drawings and digital photography take place, and production and direction in the office. The company is also involved with video games, as well as collaborating in the past with Production I.G and Bee Train for anime. In January 2008, P.A. Works produced True Tears, their first anime series as the main animation studio involved in the production process. On April 20, 2018, P.A. Works announced a new e-book label named P.A. Books, with the first release being a novel adaptation of their first anime, True Tears.

Filmography

Television series

Films

Video game animated sequences
Professor Layton and the Curious Village
Professor Layton and the Diabolical Box
Professor Layton and the Unwound Future
Professor Layton and the Last Specter
Professor Layton and the Miracle Mask
Professor Layton and the Azran Legacy
Triggerheart Exelica -Enhanced-
Wild Arms 3 with Bee Train
League of Legends Season 2019 / Season 9: A New Journey

Others
Anime project tourism Toyama: Animation part
Longing for a Tear Bringing Sky "Lovers in Tateyama" 
Longing for a Tear Bringing Sea "A Friendship on the Beach" 
Longing for a Tear Bringing Cuisine "Grandpa in Gokayama"

References

External links

P.A. Works at IMDb.com

 
Japanese animation studios
Mass media companies established in 2000
Companies based in Toyama Prefecture
Japanese companies established in 2000
Mass media in Nanto, Toyama